Trachyteuthis is a genus of fossil cephalopod, comprising five species: T. hastiformis, T. latipinnis, T. nusplingensis, T. teudopsiformis, T. covacevichi and T. chilensis.

Taxonomy
The taxonomic placement of Trachyteuthis is uncertain. Though often assigned to the order Vampyromorphida, the discovery of fossilised Trachyteuthis beaks in the Upper Jurassic limestone of Germany suggests a close phylogenetic relation to the Octopoda. It is clear that it does at least belong in the Coleoidea.  It is thought to be very closely related to Teudopsis.

Distribution

Fossils are scarce but have been reported from the Kimmeridge clay of the UK; the Solnhofen limestone of Germany, Jurassic deposits in Antarctica, and Oxfordian deposits in Chile.

History

First described in 1773 as the remnants of a fish, Trachyteuthis was considered comparable to a Sepia cuttlebone by Rüppell in 1829.  A separate genus was erected for the material in 1846 by Meyer.  English material discovered in 1855 was termed Coccoteuthis latipinnis; this was later synonymised with the identical Solnhofen deposits.  A 2007 survey of museum collection established that there were ground for the erection of three species within the genus.

References

External links
Fischerverlag Jena aus Adolf Naef "Die Fossilen Tintenfische" 1922
The Taxonomicon: Order Vampyromorphida
Mikko's Phylogeny Archive: Vampyromorpha

Coleoidea
Prehistoric cephalopod genera
Jurassic cephalopods
Solnhofen fauna
Fossil taxa described in 1846